The Complete Guide to Middle-earth: from The Hobbit to The Silmarillion is a reference book for the fictional universe called Middle-earth of J. R. R. Tolkien's legendarium, compiled and edited by Robert Foster. It was first published in 1971 under the title A Guide to Middle-earth. A revised and enlarged edition under the title The Complete Guide to Middle-earth was published in 1978. It received a third edition in 2001.

Author 

Robert Foster (b. 1949, Brooklyn) earned a Ph.D. in English and Medieval Studies at the University of Pennsylvania, and taught subsequently in the English Department at Rutgers University. Foster begun work on this in the late sixties, consulting Tolkien works and letters.

A Guide to Middle-earth 

The 1971 A Guide to Middle-earth was the first published encyclopedic reference book for the fictional universe of J. R. R. Tolkien's Middle-earth, compiled and edited by Robert Foster. The book was published in 1971 by Mirage Press, a specialist science fiction and fantasy publisher, in a limited edition of 2000 copies (750 numbered hardcovers and 1250 unnumbered paperbacks). A paperback edition was issued by Ballantine Books in 1974.

The author profile in the first edition describes Robert Foster as the then-"Tengwar Consultant" to the Tolkien Society of America. The book incorporates material previously published in the science fiction fanzine Niekas.

The Complete Guide to Middle-earth 

The Complete Guide to Middle-earth, published in 1978 was a major expansion of A Guide to Middle-earth, at almost twice its length, with coverage of The Silmarillion, which came out in 1977. However, as it does not include information on post-Silmarillion material (i.e. Unfinished Tales and the history of composition series The History of Middle-earth), the 1978 edition contains some assertions supported by later publications, and some that are contradicted. For example, the Star of Elendil jewel (the Elendilmir) is identified with the Star of the Dúnedain given to Samwise Gamgee, something refuted by Christopher Tolkien. On the other hand, Foster proposes that Gandalf and Olórin are one and the same – confirmed in Unfinished Tales.

A revised edition was published in 2001, in time for Peter Jackson's The Lord of the Rings film trilogy.

A new hardback edition illustrated by Ted Nasmith, including standard and slipcased versions, was released in September 2022.

Reception 

The Complete Guide to Middle-earth is widely recognised as an excellent reference book on Middle-earth. Christopher Tolkien has commended it himself as an "admirable work of reference".

Lester del Rey praised the 1971 version for covering "literally everything you wanted to know about Middle Earth and were unable to discover before." Three decades later, in 2002, Charles W. Nelson wrote that all the revisions of the guides were helpful for Tolkien students and enthusiasts, each new edition being a noticeable improvement over the older ones in terms of comprehensiveness. While noting that the work still suffers from minor inconsistencies, he praised most entries for being comprehensive, and the structure for being well organized, with useful indexes and appendices.

Adam Roberts, writing in The Times, calls the revised edition disappointing and "woefully outdated" in the face of the wealth of information on Tolkien now available on the Internet.

Translations 

A Polish edition, Encyklopedia Śródziemia, was published in 1998, and reprinted in 2002, 2003 and 2012. A German edition, Das Große Mittelerde-Lexikon, revised and translated by Helmut W. Pesch, was published in 2002.

References

Sources 

 
 

1978 books
2001 books
Books about Middle-earth
Middle-Earth, The Complete Guide To
Ballantine Books books